Eois roseocincta is a moth in the  family Geometridae. It is found in Guyana.

The wingspan is about 17 mm. The forewings are pale yellow, slightly deeper yellow along the costa and hind margin. There are many oblique rosy streaks on the costa. The hindwings have a rosy submarginal band, a faint cell spot and a rosy outer line.

References

Moths described in 1908
Eois
Moths of South America